Sorolopha brunnorbis is a moth of the family Tortricidae. It is found in Burma and Vietnam.

The wingspan is about 19 mm. The ground colour of the forewings is olive grey and the strigulation (fine streaks) is brownish grey. The hindwings are brown but paler towards the base.

Etymology
The name refers to the large blotch of the forewing and is derived from Latin brunneus (meaning brown) and orbis (meaning disc).

References

Moths described in 2009
Olethreutini
Moths of Asia
Taxa named by Józef Razowski